The Taylor Sportsplex is a sports facility owned by and located in the City of Taylor, Michigan. The indoor facility contains four arenas that host a variety of sporting events—especially ice hockey and soccer—and a variety of special events.

Facilities 
The Taylor Sportsplex is a premiere sports facility owned by the City of Taylor, Michigan. It contains four arenas—two are used primarily for ice hockey and figure skating; the other two are used primarily for indoor soccer. The Belle Tire Hockey Program and Eastern Michigan University are the main hockey tenants. The facility also is used for trade shows, high school graduation ceremonies, mixed martial arts and major sporting events, such as the national roller hockey championships.

Incidents 
In March 2012, the ice arena at the facility had to be evacuated due to over 80 people, including around 30 hockey players participating in the state midget major championships, became sick with flu-like symptoms. Investigators concluded the symptoms were caused by a norovirus and closed the facility for three days until it had undergone a professional cleaning.

On December 3, 2015, a shooting took place in the arena parking lot. 57-year-old Timothy Nelson Obeshaw opened fire with a handgun on the car of Sharon Elizabeth Watson, wounding her and killing her 7-year-old daughter, Emma Watson Nowling. "He struck the child first and then opened fire on the mother, and then turned and shot and killed himself," according to Taylor Police Chief Mary Sclabassi. Obeshaw was a family friend who actually lived with Emma, Watson, and Emma's father for the past year or so in nearby Belleville. He had recently moved to a home in Taylor, where police say he lived with at least one other person. Witnesses and family members told police Obeshaw had recently displayed signs of mental instability, and that he believed someone was out to 'get him'.

References

External links
Official website

Taylor, Michigan
Indoor ice hockey venues in the United States
Indoor arenas in Michigan
Sports venues in Michigan
Convention centers in Michigan
Sports venues in Wayne County, Michigan
Wayne State Warriors men's ice hockey
Sports venues completed in 2002
2002 establishments in Michigan
Defunct college ice hockey venues in the United States
Indoor soccer venues in Michigan